NTT Comware Corporation (エヌ・ティ・ティ・コムウェア株式会社 in Japanese) is a system integration company which serves mainly the NTT Group.  It started as the old NTT's IT Services department and was incorporated as a wholly owned subsidiary of NTT in 1997.

General

NTT Comware Corporation is a system integration company which serves mainly the NTT Group.  It started as the software center of the old NTT's IT Services department in 1985 and was incorporated as a wholly owned subsidiary of NTT in 1997.

Among the NTT Group companies, NTT Comware focuses on the IT services to the Group companies, while NTT Data mainly serves non-NTT Group companies, although NTT Comware has recently started to solicit work outside of the Group.

Subsidiaries
 NTT Comware Hokkaido
 NTT Comware Eastern Japan
 NTT Comware Tokai
 NTT Comware Western Japan
 NTT Comware Kyushu
 NTT Comware Billing Solution
 NTT Internet

See also
NTT and its Group companies:
 NTT Communications (NTT America, NTT Europe, etc.)
 NTT Comware
 NTT Data
 NTT DoCoMo

References
 The Japanese Wikipedia page

External links
 NTT Comware home page

Telecommunications companies based in Tokyo
Nippon Telegraph and Telephone